Gjerbës is a village and a former municipality in Berat County, central Albania. At the 2015 local government reform it became a subdivision of the municipality Skrapar. The population at the 2011 census was 813.

Notable People 
Demir Zyko , Albanian Polyphonic singer.

References

Former municipalities in Berat County
Administrative units of Skrapar
Villages in Berat County
Populated places disestablished in 2015